There are over 20,000 Grade II* listed buildings in England. This page is a list of these buildings in the district of East Northamptonshire in Northamptonshire.

East Northamptonshire

|}

Notes

External links

 
Lists of Grade II* listed buildings in Northamptonshire
East Northamptonshire District